School of Mermaids and Sharks (Escuela de sirenas y tiburones) is a 1955 Argentine film directed by Enrique Carreras and starring Amelia Vargas,  Alfredo Barbieri, Esteban Serrador and Leonor Rinaldi. The film was released on 4 August 1955. 
Enrique Carreras remade the film in 1982 under the title Los fierecillos indomables, starring Alberto Olmedo and Jorge Porcel in the lead roles.

Plot
Misunderstandings, songs and intrigues in a co-ed boarding school.

Cast
  Alfredo Barbieri as student Palmiro Varela
  Amelita Vargas as mermaid Linfor
  Esteban Serrador as Prof. Carlos Fuentes
  Leonor Rinaldi as  Srta. Tremebunda
  Francisco Álvarez as head of college
  Marcos Caplán as Palmiro Varela
  Gogó Andreu as Mamertino Álvarez
  Sandra Verani as Clotilde Cáceres
  Tincho Zabala as Pilatos
  Semillita as student
  Alfonso Pisano
  Mario Amaya 
  Tono Andreu
  Carmen Campoy as student

Reception
La Razón commented: "The classic and conventional entanglement between students and teachers that is used every time the subject of a school is comically dealt with on the screen."  Noticias Gráficas said: "Everything that is reflected on the screen is at the margin of the least demanding common sense." Raúl Manrupe and María Alejandra Portela in their book Un diccionario de films argentinos (1930–1995) wrote (translated from Spanish): "Blockbuster and simplistic, to take advantage of the moment of greatest popularity of the leading couple. The scene of the football match is copied from an identical scene in Avivato ".

References

External links
 

1955 films
1950s Spanish-language films
Argentine black-and-white films
Films directed by Enrique Carreras
1950s Argentine films